Anthurium hieronymi is a species of plant in the arum family, Araceae. It is endemic to Ecuador. It is an epiphyte which grows in coastal forest habitat.

References

hieronymi
Endangered plants
Endemic flora of Ecuador
Taxonomy articles created by Polbot